Sketches of Belgium is a 1993 album by jazz band K. D.'s Basement Party led by Kris Defoort.  It is the first release of De Werf label, and the only release by K. D.'s Basement Party.  The three musicians from Aka Moon play on the album.  It was recorded on September 7, 8, 9, 30 and October 1 and 2 in 1992.

Track listing
"Sketches of Belgium" (Kris Defoort)
"Trinkle tinkle" (Thelonious Monk)
"Anoraxia" (Defoort)
"Monk's dream" (Monk)
"New life" (Defoort)
"M 31" (Michel Hatzigeorgiou)
"Roxanne" (Sting)
"Middle jazz" (Defoort)

Personnel
 Kris Defoort - piano, leader
 Michel Hatzigeorgiou - electric bass
 Fabrizio Cassol - alto and soprano saxophone
 Michel Massot - tuba, trombone
 Bart Defoort - tenor and soprano saxophone
 Stéphane Galland - drums

See also
 Sketches of Spain
 Variations on A Love Supreme
 Kris Defoort

References
 Jazz in Belgium website
 De Werf website

1993 albums
Jazz albums by Belgian artists